Shreya Ghoshal (born 12 March 1984) is an Indian playback singer. She sings in Hindi, Tamil Telugu as well as in Kannada, Malayalam, Marathi, Gujarati, Bengali, Assamese, Nepali, Oriya, Bhojpuri, Punjabi and Tulu.
Ghoshal's career began when she won the Sa Re Ga Ma Pa contest as an adult. Her Bollywood playback singing career began with Devdas, for which she received National Film Award for Best Female Playback Singer along with Filmfare Award for Best Female Playback Singer and Filmfare RD Burman Award for New Music Talent. Since then, she has received many other awards. Ghoshal was also honored from the U.S. state of Ohio, where the governor Ted Strickland declared 26 June as "Shreya Ghoshal Day".
In April 2013, she was awarded with the highest honour in London by the selected members of House of Commons of the United Kingdom. In July 2015, John Cranley, the Mayor of the City of Cincinnati also honoured her by proclaiming 24 July 2015 as "Shreya Ghoshal Day of Entertainment and Inspiration" in Cincinnati. She was also featured five times in Forbes list of the top 100 celebrities of India. In 2017, Ghoshal became the first Indian singer to have a wax statute of her in  Madame Tussauds Museum.

After a huge success of Devdas album Shreya Ghoshal was immediately called by various regional film industries for recording songs in her voice.
In 2015, Ghoshal received a nomination in the category of Female Vocalist of the Year for the song "Tere Ishq Ne" from the movie Dil Vil Pyaar Vyaar in Mirchi Music Awards Punjabi 2014. She sang more than 25 songs in Punjabi.

This is a list of songs recorded by her in the Punjabi language.

Film Songs 
She sang more than 22 Film songs in Punjabi.

2006

2007

2009

2010

2014

2015

2017

2018

Non-Film Songs

2012

2014

2022

See also 
List of songs recorded by Shreya Ghoshal

Punjabi
Ghoshal, Shreya
Ghoshal, Shreya